Lorestan University (LU) is a public university of science and engineering in Iran, offering undergraduate and postgraduate studies. Located in Lorestan province of Iran, the university is among the top public universities and research institutes in Iran, illustrating its high status in research and education. The university has major campuses in the city of Khorramabad and several smaller campuses spread out across the province of Lorestan offering degrees in over 100 different specialties leading to B.A., B.Sc., M.A., M.Sc., D.V.M., and Ph.D. degrees. Although there has been some moves by the smaller campuses in the province to become independent universities, there are still strong ties between these newly established universities and Lorestan University.

History 
The university was founded in 1977 as a campus of Ahvaz Jundishapur University and later became independent after the Islamic Revolution.

Endowment 
Lorestan University is a public university and its funding is provided by the government of Iran. For the top-rank students from the national universities entrance exam, education is free in all public universities. Students with ranks below the normal capacity of the universities will be required to pay part or all of the tuition fee.

Language of Instruction 
Although the official language of instruction in Lorestan is Persian, a number of lecture materials, reference books, homework assignments and even exams are in English. This is especially the case for the postgraduates students which English textbooks and materials are introduced to them as the main references.

Academic year 
The academic year is divided into three academic terms, determined by the university. The first academic term usually starts late September. The second Academic term usually starts on early February, and the Summer term is usually started from early July.

Publishing 
The University's publishing arm, the Lorestan University Press, has published many different academic books and journals.

Student organisations 
There are several student organisations active throughout the university. Most of these organisations are only concentrated on academic activities with some also interested and active in political issues.

Notable faculty
Mohsen Adeli

See also 
 Education in Iran
 Higher education in Iran
 National Library of Iran
 List of Iranian Research Centers
 List of Iranian scientists from the pre-modern era
 Modern Iranian scientists and engineers

References

External links 

 
Educational institutions established in 1977
Education in Lorestan Province
Buildings and structures in Lorestan Province
1977 establishments in Iran